Wm. Knabe & Co. was a piano manufacturing company in Baltimore, Maryland from the middle of the nineteenth century through the beginning of the 20th century, and continued as a division of Aeolian-American at East Rochester, New York until 1982. It is currently a line of pianos manufactured by Samick Musical Instruments.

History 
Valentin Wilhelm Ludwig Knabe was born in Creuzburg, Saxe-Weimar, on June 3, 1803. The French campaigns in Germany in 1813 prevented him from studying to become an apothecary like his father, and instead he apprenticed with a cabinet maker, after which he worked two years as a journeyman cabinet maker, then for three years for a piano maker in Gotha, before working as a journeyman piano maker in different cities in Germany.

In 1831 Knabe accompanied his fiancée's family when they emigrated from Saxe-Meiningen to the United States, but the head of the family died during the voyage and Knabe and his bride remained in Baltimore instead of continuing to Hermann, Missouri, where a brother had settled several years earlier. Knabe worked for the well-known pianomaker Henry Hartge, and eventually abandoned his plans to become a farmer. Four years later he started selling and repairing used pianos from his house at the corner of Liberty and Lexington Streets.

Knabe & Gaehle

In 1839, Knabe formed a partnership with Henry Gaehle for the purpose of manufacturing pianos and by 1841 they moved to larger workshops at 13 South Liberty street. In 1843 they opened warerooms at the corner of Eutaw street and Cowpen alley, and four years later removed their warerooms to 9 Eutaw street, opposite the Eutaw house, selling pianos priced between $180 and $400. By 1852 they had expanded to 4, 6, 8, 9 and 11 Eutaw streets. Knabe & Gaehle won first premiums for square pianos from the Maryland Institute for the Promotion of Mechanic Arts in 1848, 1849 and 1850, as well as for grand pianos in 1849.

In 1852, the company reorganized as Knabe, Gaehle & Co. with the admission of Edward Betts as partner, and by 1853 advertised their establishment was the largest in the South, employing over 100 workmen. They manufactured six to seven octave pianos with "a double action, like Chickering's" selling for between $200 and $500.

In November 1854, their factory at Cowpen alley at the rear of Eutaw House burned, at an estimated loss of $190,000, and five weeks later their factory at Baltimore street near Paca Street burned, reportedly with little insurance coverage.

Wm. Knabe & Co. 
Proceedings started early 1855 in order to dissolve the partnership. Henry Gaehle died, and Knabe advertised he had purchased all the remaining stock and materials and would continue in business as Wm. Knabe & Co. at the old stand at 1, 3, 5, and 7 North Eutaw street, opposite the Eutaw house. William Gaehle, who had become the senior partner, advertised he was in business as Wm. Gaehle & Co., manufacturing grand and square pianos at the corner of Pratt and Green streets and with warerooms at the corner of Eutaw and Fayette streets.

Knabe purchased a former paper mill at the corner of West and China streets for a new factory, and by 1859 had established warerooms at 207 Baltimore street. He won gold medals for square pianos from the Maryland Institute in 1855, 1856, 1857 and 1858 silver medals from the Metropolitan Institute in Washington, D. C. in 1857, a medal from the Franklin Institute in Philadelphia in 1856, and first premiums from the Mechanics' Institute, Richmond, Virginia in 1855 and 1856.

In 1860, Knabe started building a new five story factory on Eutaw and West streets, but had only completed one of its wings at the outbreak of the American Civil War, which compelled them to seek new trade in the West to make up for the loss of their principal market in the South. William Knabe died May 21, 1864, and was succeeded by his sons William and Ernest J. Knabe , and son-in-law Charles Keidel.

In 1866, Wm Knabe & Co. introduced their agraffe treble with agraffes threaded into a heavier piece of brass instead of directly into the iron frame.

By 1866 they employed about 230 workmen and manufactured about a thousand pianos a year, including uprights as well as squares and grands, producing as many as thirty pianos a week. Further additions and a cupola completed the factory in 1869, fronting 210 feet (64 m) on Eutaw street and 165 feet (50 m) on West street. Their sales ranked third in the United States, after Steinway & Sons of New York and Chickering & Sons of Boston, and by 1870 their output was estimated to be about forty pianos a week, priced between $600 and $2,000.

In 1873, Wm. Knabe & Co. established their own warerooms at 112 Fifth Avenue in New York. They exhibited grand, square, and upright pianos as well as a Tschudi & Broadwood harpsichord at the 1876 Centennial Exposition in Philadelphia, and due to the revised awards system they claimed highest honors along with many of their coexhibitors. In 1882 they delivered a rosewood concert grand to the White House for President Chester A. Arthur.

 William Knabe, jr., died in 1889. The company was incorporated with a capital stock of $1,000,000 the same year, with Ernest J. Knabe as president.

Ernest J. Knabe died in 1894 and was succeeded by his sons, both of whom had trained at the factory. Ernest J. Knabe, jr. was elected president and William Knabe, vice president and treasurer.

Wm. Knabe & Co. established agencies in Canada and England by 1903, and mortgaged the factory for the purpose of extending the business further. Although the plant included modern appliances such as individually powered machines and a dust collection system connected with the boiler, Knabe advertised their standards required their pianos to be carefully handcrafted, so that a plain upright took six months and a grand two years to complete.

American Piano Co. 

In 1908, Wm. Knabe & Co., with Chickering & Sons and the Foster-Armstrong Co., of East Rochester, New York, formed the American Piano Co. under the laws of New Jersey, headed by Ernst J. Knabe Jr., president, and C. H. W. Foster of Chickering & Sons, and George G. Foster, of Foster-Armstrong, controlling their respective companies as well as Haines Brothers, Marshall & Wendell, Brewster, and J. B. Cook & Co. with a combined output of about 18,000 pianos a year.

Knabe Brothers 
Ernest and William Knabe resigned their positions in 1909, and following a series of business troubles in New York they incorporated Knabe Brothers in Ohio in 1911, with offices at Cincinnati, manufacturing upright and grand pianos at a former Smith and Nixon factory in nearby Norwood, "free from the yoke of a commercialism that figured out pianos by square inches of wood and decimal points in the allotment of wires". American Piano Co. filed suit over the use of the name but the resulting injunction only prevented Knabe Brothers from using their original nameboard label, and required the brothers to indicate this was a new company. The plant burned in January 1912, but they quickly resumed production at a temporary factory before building a modern factory on the old site. The company went into receivership late in 1916 on account of an unpaid loan, and the brothers declared bankruptcy by the end of the year.

Ernest J. Knabe died in 1927, and William Knabe died 1939.

Ampico 
In 1927 Wm. Knabe & Co. removed their New York warerooms from 437 Fifth avenue at 39th street to 657 Fifth avenue, corner of 52nd Street, and in 1928 moved to Ampico Tower at Fifth avenue and 47th street as part of American Piano Co.'s move to consolidate the sales of all their brands in an unsuccessful attempt to make up for a sharp decline in profits. American went into receivership in 1929, and Knabe's liabilities were listed as $286,000 and assets $415,000.

In 1930 American's assets were purchased by the American Piano Corporation, newly incorporated under the laws of Delaware, whose officers included former executives from American as well as executives from the Aeolian Corporation. The Knabe factory was closed, as well as the Chickering factory in Boston, and their production ultimately transferred to East Rochester, New York, where they were established as separate divisions. The old factories, including Mason & Hamlin in Boston and the Amphion in Syracuse, New York, were put on the market.

Aeolian-American 
In 1932 the American Piano Corp. merged with the Aeolian Company, Aeolian-Weber's piano subsidiary, to form the Aeolian American Corporation which consolidated the control of more than 20 piano brands, as well as action manufacturing and plate casting divisions. In 1936 it ranked as the fourth largest producer in the country, after Kimball, Baldwin and Winter & Co.

Berthold Neuer, who had been vice president and general manager from 1927 died in 1938, and his successor Richard K. Paynter died in 1940

In 1942, the East Rochester factories were contracted to manufacture military aircraft parts, keeping the plants and personnel in operation, but by late 1949 piano production returned to full capacity. The Aeolian Company and the American Piano Corporation recapitalized and merged with the Aeolian-American Corporation in 1951, and in 1957 was purchased by the owners of Winter & Co., based in Bronx, New York.

By 1981, the combined divisions at the East Rochester factory employed about 300, and it closed the following year.

Sohmer & Co. 

In 1985, Sohmer & Co. purchased the Knabe and Mason & Hamlin trademarks and their patterns and equipment from Citicorp Industrial Credit Co., Aeolian's principal creditors. Sohmer & Co. had planned to resume production of the existing models from both divisions but was itself sold and the companies reorganized with Sohmer and Knabe as subsidiaries of Mason & Hamlin.

Knabe admirers

Antoine François Marmontel
William Elam Tanner
Heinrich Schulz-Beuthen
Leopold Damrosch
Hans von Bülow
Camille Saint-Saëns
Joseph Lamb
Elvis Presley

Today
Wm. Knabe & Co. pianos are manufactured by Samick Musical Instruments, Ltd., which acquired the name from PianoDisc, owners of Mason & Hamlin, in 2001.

As of 2007, Knabes are offered in three sizes of vertical pianos – a 119 cm (47 inches) in three furniture case styles, as well as 121 cm (48 inches) and 131 cm (52 inches) models – and four sizes of grand pianos – three case styles each of 158 cm (5 feet 3 inches) the WKG53, 173 cm (5 feet 8 inches) the WKG58, 193 cm (6 feet 4 inches) the WKG64, and 215 cm (7 ft)  WKG70 models.

In early 2006, Samick Music Corporation, distributor for Samick in the United States and Canada announced they had started building a  distribution center and factory in Gallatin, Tennessee where they plan to manufacture Knabe as well as J. P. Pramberger lines beginning late 2006 or early 2007.

Elvis Presley's white 1912 Knabe was auctioned on eBay August 10–20, 2017.

In the late 20th Century, the abandoned Baltimore Knabe factory at Eutaw and West streets was razed to make way for the Baltimore Ravens' football stadium.  A sidewalk keyboard mosaic on the southwest corner of the stadium honors the Knabe legacy. The cupola that was located atop the factory now stands on the grounds of the Baltimore Museum of Industry.

References

External links
Knabe Pianos
Samick Musical Instruments, Ltd.
Samick Music Corporation
Knabe Pianos, 148–152 5th Ave., SW corner of 20th St. (2004) New York City Signs – 14th to 42nd Street
James Bartel Knabe Pianos WGMS-Classical 103.5, Washington, D. C. 2002
William Knabe Piano Institute, Baltimore, MD

Manufacturing companies based in Baltimore
Knabe, William
Knabe, Wm. and Co